Owan West is a Local Government Area of Edo State, Nigeria. Its headquarter is in the town of Sabongidda Ora.
 
It has an area of 732 km and a population of 97,388 at the 2006 census.

The postal code of the area is 313.

Wedding customs
Wedding List is the list given to the intending groom looking to marry a woman from Sabongida Ora (Owan West). Everything on the list is to be purchased and presented at the traditional wedding ceremony (this is to be fixed and agreed on before list is given). The content of the list varies based on the family head, the standard however are;

Bride's dowry (depends on the head of the family)
 Suitcase of clothes 
 An umbrella 
 A Small basin of egusi seeds
 Twenty-one tubers of yam 
 One smoked/dried antelope 
 Twenty-one kola-nuts (double lobed) 
 One large dried fish
 Twenty-one pieces of bitter kola 
 A keg of palmwine
 Twenty-one pieces of alligator pepper 
 Two bottles of schnapps 
 Two bottles of dry gin 
 Two kegs of palm oil (25 litres)
 Two bags of salt
 One she-goat 
 A bottle of honey
 A packet of sugar
 Two cartons of beer 
 Two cartons of malt drink
 Two crates each of 3 different soda drinks i.e. Cola, Pepsi, Fanta, Mirinda, Sprite etc.

Idegbe #500 (depends on family)
Igele #500 (depends on family)
Erahoin #1,000 (depends on family)
Iyanhoin #500 (depends on family)

Towns and Village 

Owan west is made up of three districts which houses several villages. the districts and some of the villages are listed below: District of Iuleha -: Aropo, Avbiognula, Avbiosi,  Eruere, Ikpeyan, Iloje, Ivbiodohen, Oah, Obii camp, Ogha Okpuje and so on; District of Ora -: Eme-ora, Igho-usie, Ikpafolame, Ogakha, Ogbeturu, Oke, Orbiogharin, Sabongida-Ora, Sobe and so on; District of Ozalla-: Ozalla.

Economy 

The crops grown in the local government includes-: Yams, Maize, Cassava, Plantain, Cocoa.  The local government also hosts a number of market such as Sabo market, Uhonmora market, Ikhin Market, Uzebba market and Ozalla market.

Festivals 

There are several festivals celebrated in Owan West Local government which includes; Obazu festival-: Obazu festival is held among the Aomas of Iuleha  which is strictly restricted to men folks, Ohonomoimen festival of luleha (Owan/Oras clan,

Ivbamen or Ororuen festival of Ozalla in Owan West, Oriminyan festival of oguta-Evbiame (Owan/Ora) clan.

Economy and Occupation

References

Local Government Areas in Edo State